D37 is a state road in Banovina region of Croatia connecting Sisak, Petrinja and Glina.

The road, as well as all other state roads in Croatia, is managed and maintained by Hrvatske ceste, state owned company.

Traffic volume 

Traffic is regularly counted and reported by Hrvatske ceste, operator of the road. Section of the road running through Sisak is not covered by the traffic counting sites, but the section is assumed to carry a substantial volume of urban traffic in addition to the regular D37 traffic.

Road junctions and populated areas

Maps

Sources

D037
D037